"The Black Cat" is the eleventh episode of the second season of Masters of Horror, directed by Stuart Gordon from a screenplay by Gordon and Dennis Paoli. It was broadcast on Showtime on January 19, 2007. The DVD was released on July 17, 2007.

Plot
The story has the great horror author Edgar Allan Poe (Jeffrey Combs) suffering from writer's block and short on cash, tormented by a black cat that will either destroy his life or inspire him to write one of his most famous stories. The 1843 short story of the same name by Poe is woven in with fictional happenings and details from his life.

Opening credits sequence
The episode's opening credits (after the series' credits) feature several of Irish artist Harry Clarke's celebrated early 20th-century illustrations for Poe's stories.

See also
Edgar Allan Poe in popular culture

External links

Masters of Horror: "The Black Cat" Set Visit, UGO
Jeffrey Combs, Star of "The Black Cat", UGO
Review, UGO

2007 American television episodes
2007 horror films
Cultural depictions of Edgar Allan Poe
Films about alcoholism
Films about death
Films about domestic violence
Films about pets
Films about writers
Films based on The Black Cat
Films based on works by Edgar Allan Poe
Films directed by Stuart Gordon
Gothic horror films
Masters of Horror episodes
Television episodes based on short fiction
Television shows based on works by Edgar Allan Poe